Cape Verdean Argentines are Argentine residents whose ancestry originated in Cape Verde. According to the 1980 census, there were about 8,000; but today's population was estimated by some sources to be around 2,000 in 2007. Other sources estimate that in 2006 there were 12,000-15,000 descendants of immigrants from Cape Verde living in Argentina, of whom about 300 are native to the African continent. 

Prior to independence in 1975, Cape Verdean immigrants were registered as Portuguese immigrants from the overseas province of Portuguese Cape Verde. The first Cape Verdeans immigrated to Argentina in small numbers in the late 19th century. The numbers increased dramatically from the 1920s to World War II. The busiest periods were between 1927 and 1933 and the third, after 1946. They were driven from Cape Verde by lack of jobs, resources, and opportunities.

Most Cape Verdeans and their descendants are centered in Buenos Aires Province. They were expert sailors and fishermen; which is why most of them settled close to the shore or in ports, and obtained sea-related occupations. They settled in ports such as Rosario, Buenos Aires, San Nicolás de los Arroyos, Bahía Blanca, Ensenada and Dock Sud. 95% of them got jobs in the Argentine Navy's Sea Fleet, in the Merchant Navy, or in the Fluvial Fleet in YPF, dockyards or ELMA.

Many used to face discrimination in the predominantly European-Argentine society.  Two organizations for mutual support and cultural exchange have existed for over 60 years: the Sociedad de Socorros Mutuos "Unión Caboverdeana" de Dock Sud, founded in 1932, and the Club Caboverdeano de Ensenada, a founded around the same period but largely focused on cultural and sports activities.

Notable Cape Verdean-Argentines
José Ramos Delgado, footballer
Diego Alonso Gómez, actor
María Fernanda Silva, diplomat
Cristian Tissone, footballer
Fernando Tissone, footballer

References

External links 
  University of Massachusetts - Dartmouth.  "1995 Cape Verdean Diaspora Population Estimates." Retrieved on October 18, 2007.
 Central Intelligence Agency.  "Argentina." World Factbook.  Retrieved on October 18, 2007.

Afro-Argentine
Argentine
Ethnic groups in Argentina